Lauren Gray (born 3 November 1991) is a Scottish curler from Stirling. As alternate for the Eve Muirhead rink, she won a gold medal at the 2013 World Championships for Scotland, and a bronze medal at the 2014 Winter Olympics for Great Britain. She became lead for Muirhead's team in 2016, and won a gold medal at the 2017 European Championships. In 2019, she was promoted to third on the team, but returned to playing lead in 2021. After a disappointing result in the 2021 World Championships, Gray was dropped from Eve Muirhead's team and replaced by Hailey Duff.

Career
She competed for the British team at the 2014 Winter Olympics in Sochi where the team won the bronze medal. She had previously been part of the British rinks which won gold medals at the 2009 European Youth Olympic Winter Festival and the 2011 Winter Universiade, as well as the Scotland rinks which won the World Junior Curling Championships in 2012 and the World Curling Championships in 2013. Following the 2014 Olympics, Gray was part of the commentary team for Channel 4's coverage of the wheelchair curling tournament at the 2014 Winter Paralympics.

In May 2016, Gray became lead for Eve Muirhead's team, having previously been alternate for Muirhead's rink in their World Championship-winning campaign in 2013 and the Olympic tournament in 2014.

Personal life
Gray was born in Glasgow and grew up in the village of Balfron where she attended Balfron Primary and then Balfron High School. She took up the sport at the age of eight.

Gray graduated from University of Glasgow with a 2:1 in English Literature and Politics in 2013, on the same day that she was formally selected for the 2014 Olympics.

She is the sister of curler Logan Gray.

Teams

References

External links
 
 Lauren Gray | Athlete Information | Winter Universiade 2013 | FISU

1991 births
Living people
Alumni of the University of Glasgow
British female curlers
Competitors at the 2011 Winter Universiade
Continental Cup of Curling participants
Curlers at the 2014 Winter Olympics
Curlers at the 2018 Winter Olympics
Curlers from Glasgow
Medalists at the 2014 Winter Olympics
Olympic bronze medallists for Great Britain
Olympic curlers of Great Britain
Olympic medalists in curling
Scottish female curlers
Universiade gold medalists for Great Britain
Universiade medalists in curling